Law Teik Hock (4 July 1922 – 13 July 2010) was a Malaysian badminton player from George Town, Penang.

Badminton career 
Law won the first edition of Thomas Cup with the Malayan team in 1949. In the final against Denmark, Law was promoted to first singles after Wong Peng Soon was forced to skip the final due to an injury. In his first singles, he defeated Jørn Skaarup 15-5, 15-0 but lost 15-11, 15-1 to Mogen Felsby in the reverse singles. 

In 1948, Law partnered Eddy Choong to a historic victory at the Penang Open. In the finals of the tournament, they defeated Ooi Teik Hock and Tan Kin Hong with the score line of 15-8 and 15-11, which was the first defeat for Ooi and Tan for over seven years. 

In 1952, although Law did not make it to the national trials for the Malayan Thomas Cup qualifying team, he however, won the Malaysia Open men's doubles title for the first time.

Personal life 
Law was married to Khoo Cheng Poh and they had a son named Beng Yeow.

Death 
Law died of old age in his residence in Jalan Anson, George Town. He was 88.

References

1922 births
Malaysian male badminton players
Malaysian sportspeople of Chinese descent
2010 deaths
Sportspeople from Penang